The 1987 Big Sky Conference men's basketball tournament was the twelfth edition, held March 5–7 at the Walkup Skydome at Northern Arizona University in Flagstaff, Arizona.

Seventh-seeded Idaho State upset fourth-seeded  in the championship game,  to clinch their second Big Sky tournament title (first was a decade earlier).

The top three seeds (Boise State) lost in the first round, which led to a revised format the  ISU had entered the tournament with a  conference record,  overall.

Format
For the fourth year, all eligible teams participated in the tournament field and were placed in the quarterfinals. Seedings and pairings were determined by regular season conference records.

Bracket

NCAA tournament
The Bengals received the automatic bid to the 64-team NCAA tournament, but were seeded sixteenth in the West regional and were routed in the first round by UNLV in  No other Big Sky members were invited to the tournament, but Montana State and Boise State played in the 32-team NIT and hosted first round games. BSU defeated  by a point and MSU lost by eight to Washington, who defeated the Broncos by five points in the second round in Seattle.

References

Big Sky Conference men's basketball tournament
Tournament
Big Sky Conference men's basketball tournament
Big Sky Conference men's basketball tournament
Flagstaff, Arizona
College basketball tournaments in Arizona